The Cosmic Anisotropy Telescope (CAT) was a three-element interferometer for cosmic microwave background radiation (CMB/R) observations at 13 to 17 GHz, based at the Mullard Radio Astronomy Observatory. In 1995, it was the first instrument to measure small-scale structure in the cosmic microwave background. When the more sensitive Very Small Array came online, the CAT telescope was decommissioned in a ceremonial bonfire.

External links 
 Cosmic Anisotropy Telescope (CAT) online
 The first detection of small-scale structure in the cosmic microwave background
 Press release from 1995 describing first measurements of small-scale structure in the cosmic microwave background
 The CAT enclosure on Google Maps

Cavendish Laboratory
Radio telescopes
Interferometric telescopes
Cosmic microwave background experiments